National Route 830 (N830) is a secondary route that forms part of the Philippine highway network from Santander to Carcar. There are four components of the route, namely Natalio Bacalso Avenue (in Santander), Santander–Barili–Toledo Road, Carcar–Barili Road and Carcar–Barili–Mantapuyan Road.

History 

During the addition of National Routes by the Department of Public Works and Highways, the roads Natalio Bacalso Avenue (in Santander), Santander—Barili–Toledo Road, Carcar–Barili Road and Carcar–Barili–Mantapuyan Road were designated components for N830.

Route description

Santander 
The route starts as Natalio Bacalso Avenue from a route change from National Route 8 (N8) in Santander. Near the Boundary of Samboan and Santander, the road is changed to Santander–Barili–Toledo Road.

Santander to Barili 
The road in this section is Santander–Barili–Toledo Road. After the junction of Barili–Mantapuyan Road, the road is considered as Carcar–Barili Road.

Barili to Carcar 
This Road for this section is Carcar–Barili Road. After the boundary of Barili and Carcar, the road is considered Carcar–Barili Road and ends in Carcar in a roundabout in Natalio Bacalso Avenue.

References 

Roads in Cebu